Rutles Highway Revisited is a various artists compilation album, released in 1990 by Shimmy Disc. It comprises cover versions of songs recorded by The Rutles. The album title is a reference to the 1965 Bob Dylan album Highway 61 Revisited.

Track listing

Personnel 
Adapted from the Rutles Highway Revisited liner notes.
 Kramer – production, engineering

Release history

References

External links 
 

1990 compilation albums
Albums produced by Kramer (musician)
Shimmy Disc compilation albums